Rudy "RJ" Stretch (born September 21, 1999) is an American soccer player who currently plays for the Portland Pilots.

Career
Stretch was part of the Seattle Sounders FC academy, and appeared for their USL affiliate side Seattle Sounders FC 2 during their 2018 season.

Stretch has committed to joining the college soccer program at the University of Portland later in 2018.

References

External links
 Rudy Stretch at U.S. Soccer Development Academy (Seattle Sounders FC)
 

1999 births
Living people
American soccer players
Tacoma Defiance players
Association football midfielders
Soccer players from Washington (state)
USL Championship players
Sportspeople from Spokane, Washington
Portland Pilots men's soccer players